Aplu, APLU may refer to:

 Aplu (deity), an Etruscan deity
 Asia Pacific Lacrosse Union
 Association of Public and Land-grant Universities (US)